Sanada Sandaiki (真田三代記) is a novel about Sanada Masayuki, Sanada Yukimura and Sanada Daisuke published in mid Edo period.

External links 
Sanada Sandaiki, Waseda University Library
Sanada Sandaiki, Ebook and Texts Archive

Japanese novels
Biographical novels
Edo-period works